The Rainbow Landscape or Landscape with Rainbow is a c. 1636 landscape painting by Peter Paul Rubens, now in the Wallace Collection in London. It forms a pendant to  A View of Het Steen in the Early Morning which is held in the National Gallery in London

External links
Catalogue entry

Paintings by Peter Paul Rubens
1636 paintings
Paintings in the Wallace Collection
Rainbows in art